The Grossvatertanz (Grandfather Dance) is a German dance tune from the 17th century. It is generally considered a traditional folk tune.

It is a tripartite tune:
 8 bars in  time, Andante
 4 bars of a different theme in  time, Allegro (repeated)
 4 bars of a further theme, in  time, Allegro (repeated).

The first part was sung to the words:

New lyrics to the first part of the tune were written by Klamer Eberhard Karl Schmidt in 1794 and August Friedrich Ernst Langbein in 1812, both "lengthy and dull pieces of ornate poetry" (Franz Magnus Böhme, 1886).  (1766–1853) in 1823 composed a new tune to Langbein's lyrics, for which he has erroneously been claimed to be the real author.

Robert Schumann quoted the Grossvatertanz in a number of works, among them:
 the final section of Papillons, Op. 2 (1831)
 the final section ("") of Carnaval, Op. 9 (1834–35), where he labels the theme  (Theme from the 17th century).

Pyotr Ilyich Tchaikovsky also quotes the tune in act 1 of his ballet The Nutcracker (1892). It appears at the end of the Christmas party. Tchaikovsky was a great admirer of Schumann's music, but it is not clear whether this was meant as some sort of tribute to Schumann or simply as an appropriate tune to use in music depicting the winding up of a happy family event.

More recently, the German composer Jörg Widmann has used the Grossvatertanz in his Third String Quartet, "Jagdquartett" (2003), to evoke a hunt.

References

Further reading
 Eric Blom ed., Grove's Dictionary of Music and Musicians, 5th ed. 1954
 Max Friedlaender (1918): Das Großvaterlied und der Großvatertanz. In: Festschrift Hermann Kretzschmar zum siebzigsten Geburtstage. Peters, Leipzig, pp. 29–36.

German folk dances
German folk songs
Wedding songs
Baroque dance